Ælfsige (or Aelfsige, Ælfsin or Aelfsin; died 959) was Bishop of Winchester before he became Archbishop of Canterbury in 959.

Life
Ælfsige became Bishop of Winchester in 951. In 958, with the death of the previous Archbishop Oda, he was translated from the see of Winchester to become archbishop of Canterbury. He is said by Arthur Hussey to have trampled contemptuously on Oda's grave, "with reproaches for having so long kept himself out of that dignity".

Ælfsige died of cold in the Alps as he journeyed to Rome to be given his pallium by Pope John XII. In his place King Eadwig nominated Byrhthelm. Ælfsige's will survives and shows that he was married, with a son, Godwine of Worthy, who died in 1001 fighting against the Vikings.

Citations

References

External links
 

959 deaths
Archbishops of Canterbury
Bishops of Winchester
10th-century English archbishops
Year of birth unknown
10th-century English bishops